Stephen Antony "Stumpy" Thomas (born July 15, 1963) is a British-born Canadian former ice hockey right winger who played 20 seasons in the National Hockey League (NHL) for the Toronto Maple Leafs, Chicago Blackhawks, New York Islanders, New Jersey Devils, Mighty Ducks of Anaheim and Detroit Red Wings.

Playing career
Thomas was born in Stockport, England but was raised in Markham, Ontario, Canada where he attended Markham District High School. As he often coasted in school on his hockey skills, he once had a teacher tell him to "smarten up, Steve; hockey can only take you so far". He played junior hockey for the Toronto Marlboros of the OHL (he was the last original Toronto Marlboro to make it to the Maple Leafs of the NHL).  Prior to playing in the NHL, Thomas won the Dudley "Red" Garrett Memorial Award in 1985 as the top rookie in the American Hockey League, while playing for the St. Catharines Saints.

Thomas went undrafted after his junior career but signed as a Free Agent with the Toronto Maple Leafs. He began his NHL career in the 1984–85 season. He developed into a bona-fide NHL goal scorer with Toronto, scoring 35 goals in the 1986–87 season. He was traded to the Chicago Blackhawks that summer and played for Chicago until 1991–92 and was then traded to the New York Islanders.

It would be with the Islanders that Thomas would have his best years. In the 1992–93 season, Thomas scored 37 goals and 50 assists for a career-high of 87 points. During the playoffs, when Islanders superstar Pierre Turgeon was injured by a Dale Hunter check in the first round, Thomas and teammate Ray Ferraro emerged as the unlikely heroes of the Islander's playoff run. Both made the top ten in postseason scoring as the Islanders made their Cinderella run to the Prince of Wales Conference finals. The next year, he set a career-high in goals with 42.

Thomas had second stints with the Leafs (1998–2001) and Chicago (2001–2002) before moving to the Mighty Ducks of Anaheim. His career looked to be over with Chicago, however the trade to the Ducks instantly rejuvenated his career. After scoring just 4 goals with the Blackhawks, Thomas had 10 goals in the final 12 games of the season with the Ducks and added 4 more goals in the postseason as his team made it to their first Stanley Cup Finals. The Ducks had wanted to keep Thomas for 2003-2004 as well, but they ran out of money, and Thomas's absence negatively affected his former linemates.

Despite being considered a great playoff player, Thomas was never able to capture a Stanley Cup in his career. He came close in 2002–03 when his Mighty Ducks of Anaheim made it to the Stanley Cup Finals, the first of his and the team's, but they lost to the New Jersey Devils in a hard fought 7 games.

Thomas signed a one-year contract (2003–2004) with the Detroit Red Wings before the 2004–05 NHL lockout and proved effective playing on a line with youngster Pavel Datsyuk and Brett Hull. At one stretch in the season, Thomas had 10 points in 13 games, and he enjoyed more ice time than he initially expected due to injuries among the Wings' roster. The Wings finished first in the league but lost in the second round of the playoffs to the Calgary Flames.

After the 2004–05 NHL lockout he was invited to the Toronto Maple Leafs tryout in 2005, but he was cut before the regular season started.

Trades and signings
Traded to Chicago by Toronto with Rick Vaive and Bob McGill for Al Secord and Ed Olczyk, September 3, 1987. Traded to NY Islanders by Chicago with Adam Creighton for Brent Sutter and Brad Lauer, October 25, 1991. Traded to New Jersey by NY Islanders for Claude Lemieux, October 3, 1995. Signed as a free agent by Toronto, July 30, 1998. Signed as a free agent by Chicago. Traded to Anaheim by Chicago for Anaheim's 5th round choice (Chicago drafted Alexei Ivanov) in 2003 NHL Entry Draft, March 11, 2003. Signed as a free agent by Detroit, November 5, 2003.

Post-playing career

He was an Assistant/Mentor Coach for the St. Michael's Buzzers, a Jr. A team in Toronto.

On September 3, 2010, Thomas was named player development consultant for the Tampa Bay Lightning,  working with former Red Wings teammate Steve Yzerman, who served as Tampa Bay's general manager. Thomas monitored and oversaw all of Tampa Bay's prospects. He later worked  as an assistant coach for the Lightning from 2012-16.

Thomas was named an assistant coach with the St. Louis Blues on June 30, 2016. He spent one season on the Blues' staff.

Personal life
Steve and his wife Lori, have two children, a daughter Lauren Thomas (born 1994) and a son Christian Thomas (born 1992), who is currently playing for HC Bozen-Bolzano of the Austrian Hockey League. Christian Thomas was drafted 40th overall by the New York Rangers in the 2nd round of the 2010 NHL Entry Draft. Lauren Thomas married current Anaheim Ducks forward Adam Henrique. In his third OHL season in 2010–11, Christian Thomas finished second in the league with 54 goals and sixth in the league in scoring with 99 points, while also tying for the league lead in power play goals.  Steve and Christian Thomas are the first father-son combination to each score 50 goals in a single OHL season.

Career statistics

Regular season and playoffs

International

Trivia
Thomas appeared in the 1986 hockey-themed movie Youngblood alongside Rob Lowe and Keanu Reeves and, in one scene, is memorably towel-snapped by Patrick Swayze.

See also
List of National Hockey League players from the United Kingdom
List of NHL players with 1000 games played

References
 2005 NHL Official Guide & Record Book 
 # 32 Steve Thomas RW

External links

1963 births
Living people
Canadian ice hockey right wingers
Chicago Blackhawks players
Detroit Red Wings players
English emigrants to Canada
Ice hockey people from Ontario
Mighty Ducks of Anaheim players
New Jersey Devils players
New York Islanders players
Sportspeople from Stockport
St. Catharines Saints players
St. Louis Blues coaches
Sportspeople from Markham, Ontario
Tampa Bay Lightning coaches
Toronto Marlboros players
Toronto Maple Leafs players
Undrafted National Hockey League players
Canadian ice hockey coaches